John Adams Harper (November 2, 1779 – June 18, 1816) was an American politician and a United States Representative from New Hampshire.

Early life
Born in Derryfield, New Hampshire, Harper attended Phillips Exeter Academy in 1794. He studied law and was admitted to the bar about 1802, commencing practice in Sanbornton.

Career
Harper was the first postmaster of Sanbornton, then moved to Meredith Bridge (now Laconia, Belknap County) in 1806. He served as clerk of the New Hampshire Senate, 1805–1808, was a member of the New Hampshire House of Representatives in 1809 and 1810. He served in the State militia, 1809–1812.

Elected as a Democratic-Republican to the Twelfth Congress, Harper served as United States Representative for the state of New Hampshire from (March 4, 1811 – March 3, 1813). He supported the Declaration of War in June 1812, and was an unsuccessful candidate for reelection in 1812 to the Thirteenth Congress.

Death
Harper died at Meredith Bridge (now Laconia), New Hampshire, on June 18, 1816, (age 36 years, 229 days). He is interred in Union Cemetery, Laconia, Belknap County, New Hampshire.

References

External links

John Adams Harper entry at The Political Graveyard

1779 births
1816 deaths
Members of the New Hampshire House of Representatives
Phillips Exeter Academy alumni
Democratic-Republican Party members of the United States House of Representatives from New Hampshire
People from Manchester, New Hampshire
People from Sanbornton, New Hampshire
People from Laconia, New Hampshire